Mountain View Park in North Vancouver, British Columbia, Canada is a natural park, pond, and upland area (beyond the park boundaries) categorized as a Woody Wetland, inside a second-growth temperate rain forest. It is critical habitat to a species at risk, and one of the few remaining viable wetlands left in the District of North Vancouver.

Forested greenbelt with informal trails, noted in the District OCP as future neighborhood park.

Details
 Location: Access between McNair Dr. and Hoskins Road
 Size: 6.79 ha

Facilities
 Community Park
 Walking/Hiking
 Natural Area
 Dogs off Leash (under control)

External links
 Map

North Vancouver (district municipality)
Parks in Greater Vancouver